Megastraea is a genus of medium-sized to large sea snails with a calcareous operculum, marine gastropod mollusks in the family Turbinidae, the turban snails.

Species
Species within this genus were previously placed in the genus Astraea. They include:
 Megastraea turbanica (Dall, 1910)
 Megastraea undosa (Wood, 1828)

References

 
Turbinidae
Gastropod genera